Jai Serong is a professional Australian Rules Football player who plays for  as a midfielder or forward in the AFL. He has also played for Box Hill Hawks in the Victorian Football League.

Early life

Serong grew up on a dairy farm near the Victorian country town of Inverloch before his family moved to Warragul. 

He was drafted with the 53rd selection in the 2021 AFL draft from Gippsland Power in the NAB League.

AFL career 

Statistics 
Updated to the end of the 2022 season.

|-
| 2022 ||  || 29
| 3 || 1 || 0 || 7 || 6 || 13 || 5 || 5 || 0.3 || 0.0 || 2.3 || 2.0 || 4.3 || 1.7 || 1.7 || 0
|- class="sortbottom"
! colspan=3| Career
! 3 !! 1 !! 0 !! 7 !! 6 !! 13 !! 5 !! 5 !! 0.3 !! 0.0 !! 2.3 !! 2.0 !! 4.3 !! 1.7 !! 1.7 !! 0
|}

References

External links

Hawthorn Football Club players
Box Hill Football Club players
Gippsland Power players
2003 births
Living people